Evander Holyfield vs. Lennox Lewis II, was a professional boxing match contested on November 13, 1999 for the WBA, WBC, IBF, and vacant IBO heavyweight championships.

Background
The two fighters had met eight months prior in Madison Square Garden. Though Lewis had seemingly done enough to win, the bout was declared a draw, with one judge ruling the fight in favor of Lewis 116–113, another scoring the fight in Holyfield's favor with a score of 115–113 and the third declaring the fight even at 115–115. The ruling became one of the most controversial in boxing history, and as such, the three sanctioning bodies quickly ordered a rematch between the two.

A week after this first fight, Holyfield and Lewis agreed to the rematch, with the fight's US$30 million purse being evenly split between them. The match was originally scheduled for September, but was pushed back to November 13, with Las Vegas' Thomas & Mack Center being announced as the site of the fight. The fight was to occur exactly seven years after Riddick Bowe defeated Holyfield to become the last undisputed heavyweight champion. The men were to fight for the three major belts and the lesser-regarded IBO heavyweight title, which was awarded to Lewis prior to the fight.

The fight
Like in the previous fight, Lewis gained an early advantage, winning both rounds 1 and 2. Lewis won round 3 on two of the judges' scorecards, but a late rally from Holyfield during the final 30 seconds in which he landed several punches, including a hard right to the side of Lewis' head, helped him win on the third judge's scorecard. Holyfield then won the next four rounds. In an entertaining round 7, the two fighters fought in the middle of ring during the final 20 seconds, each landing several punches. Lewis seized control of the fight by winning rounds 8 to 11. The men fought a close round 12, but Lewis again took the round on two of the judges' scorecards. Lewis was then named the winner by unanimous decision with scores of 115–113, 116–112 and 117–111, becoming the first undisputed heavyweight champion in nearly seven years.

Aftermath
Lewis' reign as undisputed heavyweight champion lasted less than six months. The WBA wanted Lewis to defend the championship against their number one contender John Ruiz. However, Lewis wanted to first defend his titles against Michael Grant. The WBA and Lewis agreed that he would fight Grant first followed by Ruiz. Ruiz's promoter Don King challenged the decision in court and a clause was found in Lewis' contract that stated the winner of the Holyfield–Lewis fight would first defend his titles against the WBA's number one contender. Because of this, Lewis was stripped of his WBA title. He proceeded with his match against Grant, successfully defending his remaining titles after defeating Grant by 2nd round knockout. The WBA then created a "Super World Champion" title allowing unified champions more time in between mandatory title defenses.

The WBA chose Holyfield to face Ruiz for the vacant WBA Heavyweight title. Holyfield defeated Ruiz by unanimous decision to regain the title, becoming the first four-time heavyweight champion in boxing history. He lost the title to Ruiz in his next fight and then fought Ruiz a third time, this time to a draw. He met Hasim Rahman to determine who would face Lewis for the heavyweight championship. Though Holyfield won, Lewis opted to face Mike Tyson and Lewis–Holyfield III never materialized.

Broadcasting

References

1999 in boxing
Boxing in Las Vegas
1999 in sports in Nevada
Lewis 2
Holyfield 2
World Boxing Association heavyweight championship matches
World Boxing Council heavyweight championship matches
International Boxing Federation heavyweight championship matches
Boxing on HBO
November 1999 sports events in the United States